Zenith Jones Brown (December 8, 1898 – August 25, 1983) was an American crime fiction writer who also wrote for a time in England. She wrote under the pseudonyms David Frome, Leslie Ford, and Brenda Conrad. She is perhaps best known for her novels featuring the fictional Grace Latham and John Primrose, though some of her earlier standalone work has been praised.

She was born Zenith Jones in Smith River, California and grew up in Tacoma, Washington. Brown was educated at the University of Washington, and worked there as a teaching assistant from 1921 to 1923. She was also assistant to the editor and circulation manager for Dial magazine from 1922 to 1923. Brown began writing as “David Frome” in 1929 while staying in London with her husband. She returned to the United States in 1931, and the couple settled in Annapolis, Maryland. Brown used the pen name “Leslie Ford” for her mystery novels published in the United States. During World War II, she wrote several novels about nurses under the name “Brenda Conrad”. Brown was also a war correspondent for the United States Air Force in England and the Pacific.

Her books often appeared in serial format in The Saturday Evening Post before being published. Brown also wrote short stories, which were published in various periodicals and anthologies.

She married Ford K. Brown, a professor, in 1921. The couple had one daughter.

Brown died at the Church Home and Hospital in Baltimore at the age of 84.

Selected books 
 as David Frome
 Murder of an Old Man (1929)
 The Hammersmith Murders (1930) - Features Mr. Evan Pinkerton
 The Strange Death of Martin Green (1930) (The Murder on the Sixth Hole in Britain)
 Two Against Scotland Yard (1931) - Pinkerton
 The Man From Scotland Yard (1932) - Pinkerton
 The Eel Pie Murders (1933) - Pinkerton
 Scotland Yard Can Wait (1933)
 Mr. Pinkerton Finds a Body (1934)
 Mr. Pinkerton Goes to Scotland Yard (1934)
 Mr. Pinkerton Grows a Beard (1935)
 Mr. Pinkerton Has The Clue (1936)
 The Black Envelope (1937) - Pinkerton
 Mr. Pinkerton at the Old Angel (1939)
 Passage For One (1945) - Pinkerton
 Homicide House (1950) - Pinkerton
 as Leslie Ford
 The Sound of Footsteps (1931)
 By The Watchman's Clock (1932)
 Murder in Maryland (1932)
 The Clue of the Judas Tree (1933)
 The Strangled Witness (1934) - Colonel John Primrose
 Ill Met By Moonlight (1937) - Mrs. Grace Latham and Col. Primrose
 The Simple Way of Poison (1937) - Mrs. Latham and Col. Primrose
 Three Bright Pebbles (1938) - Mrs. Latham
 Old Lover's Ghost (1939) - Mrs. Latham and Col. Primrose
 Reno Rendezvous (1939) - Mrs. Latham and Col. Primrose
 The Town Cried Murder (1939) -
 The Road to Folly (1940) - Mrs. Latham and Col. Primrose
 The Murder of a Fifth Columnist (1941) - Mrs. Latham and Col. Primrose
 Murder in the O.P.M. (1942) - Mrs. Latham and Col. Primrose
 Murder with Southern Hospitality - Mrs. Latham and Col. Primrose
 All For The Love of a Lady (1943) - Mrs. Latham and Col. Primrose
 Siren in the Night (1943) - Mrs. Latham and Col. Primrose
 The Philadelphia Murder Story (1945) - Mrs. Latham and Col. Primrose
 False To Any Man (1947) - Mrs. Latham and Col. Primrose
 Honolulu Murder Story (1947) - Mrs. Latham and Col. Primrose
 The Devil's Stronghold (1948) - Mrs. Latham and Col. Primrose
 The Woman In Black (1948) - Mrs. Latham
 Date With Death (1949)
 Murder is the Pay-Off (1951)
 The Bahamas Murder Case (1952)
 Washington Whispers Murder (1953) - Mrs. Latham and Col. Primrose
 Invitation to Murder (1954)
 Murder Comes to Eden (1955)
 The Girl from the Mimosa Club (1957)
 Trial by Ambush (1962)
 as Brenda Conrad
 The Stars Give Warning (1941)
 Caribbean Conspiracy (1942)
 Girl with a Golden Bar (1944)

References 

1898 births
1983 deaths
American expatriates in England
American mystery novelists
20th-century pseudonymous writers
Pseudonymous women writers
University of Washington alumni